Charles Marie Bouton (16 May 1781 in Paris – 28 June 1853) was a French painter.

He was a student of Jacques-Louis David, Jean-Victor Bertin and the first French panorama painter Pierre Prévost. He concentrated mostly on the perspective and the art of distributing light and was thus led to the invention of the Diorama, which he shares the honor with Jacques Daguerre.

As a painter, he has reproduced happily Souterrains de Saint-Denis, la cathédrale de Chartres, and an interior view of the church of Saint-Etienne-du-Mont.

References 
Charles Marie Bouton (Wikipedia French)

External links 
 Charles Marie Bouton in Joconde database

Sources 
 Pierre Defer, General Catalogue of auctions of paintings and prints from 1737 to the present day, Paris, Aubry, 1868, 90–3.

18th-century French painters
French male painters
19th-century French painters
1853 deaths
Pupils of Jacques-Louis David
1781 births
19th-century male artists
18th-century French male artists